Firebrand is a name of different characters appearing in American comic books published by DC Comics.

Fictional character biography

Rod Reilly

Published by Quality Comics from August 1941 to November 1942, Rod Reilly was the bored and wealthy socialite son of a steel tycoon, who decided to fight crime with his servant and friend, "Slugger" Dunn. Originally drawn by Reed Crandall, Firebrand appeared in Police Comics, issues #1 through 13, at which time his series was canceled. Firebrand's costume consisted of a transparent shirt and red pants, with a bandana mask covering the top half of his face. He uses a lariat, and can climb buildings using vacuum cups.

After DC purchased Quality Comics, Firebrand was largely left on the sidelines until the mid-1970s, when he joined the Freedom Fighters. He was killed in a fight with the Silver Ghost, but that occurred only in a photocopied issue of Cancelled Comic Cavalcade, which was never released to public and thus unsure as to whether it is considered part of the current DC Universe.

When DC collected most of their '40s characters into the All-Star Squadron, it was retconned that Rod had been injured in the Japanese attack on Pearl Harbor, and replaced by his sister, Danette Reilly.

In All-Star Squadron #5 (Vol. 2, 1981), Danette discovers that Rod is Firebrand while staying at his penthouse. Musing about Rod's relationship with his bodyguard, Slugger Dunn, she wonders "though what a confirmed bachelor playboy like my brother needed with a bodyguard, I never understood", and then finds a hidden closet that leads her to think that "from the look of these clothes, I didn't know my brother quite as well as I thought I did!".

Danette Reilly

Volcanologist Danette Reilly is the sister of Rod Reilly, the first Firebrand.  First introduced in a special "All-Star Squadron" preview in Justice League of America #193 (August 1981), Danette was studying volcanos north of Hawaii in the 1940s when she was kidnapped by the time travelling villain Per Degaton and one of the JSA foes he had pulled back in time, the powerful sorcerer Wotan. During her escape, Wotan hit her with a magical blast and hurled her into a pit of lava. The combination of his magic and the lava not only allowed her to survive, but gave her the power to control heat and project fire blasts (first seen in All-Star Squadron #5, January 1982). Her powers surfaced after she discovered her brother Rod's costume and put it on. As Rod had been injured during the attack on Pearl Harbor, Danette decided to become the new Firebrand. Due to Per Degaton going back to 1947 when he was defeated, the All-Star Squadron forgot his attack. Originally she was quite racist towards the Japanese, but she visited her brother in hospital and he revealed he had been saved from death by a soldier whose parents were from Japan, and who later died from his wounds. Firebrand realized she had been racist and should show more respect towards those from Japan.

Danette appeared in Crisis on Infinite Earths, wherein she was briefly rejoined by her former lover, the reluctant supervillain Cyclotron. Cyclotron, although deceased, phased into her time to assist her. Danette assumed partial custody of his daughter Terri, along with fellow hero the Atom. This made her technically the grandmother of Terri's son, Atom Smasher. Her later adventures have thus far been unchronicled.

After great battle, Danette assisted and later married the Shining Knight (Sir Justin). Together they faced the Dragon King and Danette was apparently killed, but to end Shining Knight manages slew Dragon King and avenges Firebrand.

Her name is a homage to creator Roy Thomas' wife, Danette "Dann" Thomas.

The Quality Comics heroine Wildfire was originally intended to play a major role in the All-Star Squadron but DC objected on the basis of her name, which she shared with the Legion of Super-Heroes member. Instead, Danette Reilly was introduced into the series.

Firebrand was ranked 67th in Comics Buyer's Guide's "100 Sexiest Women in Comics" list.

Alex Sanchez
 
In February 1996, DC introduced a third Firebrand, former police detective Alejandro 'Alex' Sanchez. After nearly dying in an explosion that destroyed his apartment, Sanchez underwent experimental surgery to restore his mobility. The surgery was paid for by local philanthropist Noah Hightower, who later approached Sanchez with a special opportunity. Hightower offered Sanchez a suit of advanced armor which, when combined with the implants, would give Sanchez enhanced strength and speed for a period up to four hours. After Sanchez's partner was attacked during an investigation, he agreed to become the superhero Firebrand. In addition to enhanced strength, Sanchez's armor emits a greenish flame, giving him a demonic appearance.

Alejandro's storyline reflected concerns about racial injustice in America, and violence suffered by people of color.

Sanchez's tenure as Firebrand lasted only nine issues of his self-titled comic. He reappeared in JSA: Secret Files #2, where he is stabbed in the throat and apparently dies in Roulette's underground gaming arena, the House, at the hands of a drugged Checkmate knight.

Andre Twist

In April 2006, Andre Twist was introduced in The Battle for Blüdhaven. He gains control over fire after his exposure to Chemo being dropped on the city. He also appears in the limited series, Uncle Sam and the Freedom Fighters, as a member of the new Freedom Fighters. Andre carries a bo staff, and has some measure of athletic and martial arts ability. In The Battle for Blüdhaven #5, Andre hears a voice in his head, asking him to come to the Mississippi River and fight for liberty, claiming that Andre is pure of heart and will be his Firebrand. The voice is that of Uncle Sam.

After joining forces with Uncle Sam, Andre is captured and tortured by Father Time after attacking senator/presidential candidate Henry Knight, who is really Gonzo the Mechanical Bastard. He is freed from captivity by Phantom Lady, and joins the rest of the Freedom Fighters to recruit the new Black Condor.

He and the rest of the Freedom Fighters manage to defeat Gonzo, and are offered positions as the new leaders of S.H.A.D.E.

In the 2007 Freedom Fighters series, Firebrand strikes up a relationship with Red Bee, and is distraught when she had been taken over by an alien insectoid race. Together, the Freedom Fighters are able to save Red Bee, and repel the insectoid's invasion. In the 2010-2011 mini-series, Twist was first paralyzed during a fight and later killed in action.

Janet Fals
The latest Firebrand, Janet Fals, appeared in The Unexpected series (not to be confused with The Unexpected fantasy/horror series also released by DC Comics during 1968-1982), first issue released in June 2018.

Janet died during the Dark Multiverse invasion, but her father used his CIA connections to bring her back to life, releasing her remains to Civil Solutions, a futurist arms developer, who resurrected her with a new heart called the "Conflict Engine". The device requires her to start fights to stay alive, meaning she could not return to her old life or identity. She quenches her needs by fighting in underground matches as Firebrand.

She had a flirtation with Joy, a female receptionist at V.A. Hospital in Mammoth City. Janet Fals/Firebrand's creator Steve Orlando has confirmed that she is a lesbian.

Powers and abilities
An olympic-level athlete and superb hand-to-hand combatant, the Rod Reilly Firebrand possessed no true super-powers, but he was personally trained by ex-heavyweight boxer "Slugger" Dunn to the height of physical perfection.

In other media
A variation of Danette Reilly / Firebrand appears in the Young Justice episode "Humanity", voiced by Vanessa Marshall. This version is an android codenamed "Red Inferno" that T.O. Morrow created to infiltrate the Justice Society of America in the 1930s, though she overcame her programming and seemingly died taking an energy blast from Dragon King meant for the Flash. In the present, an android double of Morrow rebuilds Red Inferno and sends her alongside Red Torpedo to capture Red Tornado. However, Red Tornado convinces his fellow androids stop Red Volcano before he causes the Yellowstone Caldera to erupt. Red Inferno and Torpedo sacrifice themselves to help Red Tornado avert the eruption.

References

External links
Firebrand I Index
Firebrand I Profile
Rod Reilly at the Unofficial Guide to the DC Universe
Danette Reilly at the Unofficial Guide to the DC Universe
Alex Sanchez at the Unofficial Guide to the DC Universe
Andre Twist at the Unofficial Guide to the DC Universe
Firebrand (1941) at Don Markstein's Toonopedia. Archived from the original on July 25, 2016.
 First appearance of Janet Fals.

Articles about multiple fictional characters
Characters created by Dan Jurgens
Characters created by Jerry Ordway
Characters created by Roy Thomas
DC Comics American superheroes
DC Comics female superheroes
DC Comics LGBT superheroes
DC Comics metahumans
DC Comics titles
Fictional activists
Fictional characters with fire or heat abilities
Fictional lesbians
Comics characters introduced in 1941
Comics characters introduced in 1981
Comics characters introduced in 1996
Comics characters introduced in 2006
Comics characters introduced in 2018
Golden Age superheroes
Quality Comics superheroes